The Garvan Institute of Medical Research is an Australian biomedical research institute located in , Sydney, New South Wales. Founded in 1963 by the Sisters of Charity as a research department of St Vincent's Hospital, it is now one of Australia's largest medical research institutions, with approximately 750 scientists, students and support staff. The executive director of the institute since 2018 is Professor Chris Goodnow .

In 2014 the institute became one of only three organisations in the world – and the only one outside the United States – able to sequence the human genome at a base cost below 1,000 each (the $1,000 genome) when it purchased the next generation of genome sequencing equipment, which is capable of sequencing 350 genomes a week (18,000 a year).

History

Funds for its establishment were provided by a centenary hospital appeal by the Sisters of Charity for St Vincent's Hospital. Helen Mills, the largest donor, asked for the centre to be named after her father James Patrick Garvan, a distinguished New South Wales parliamentarian and business leader.

The Kinghorn Cancer Centre, a 100 million joint venture between Garvan and St Vincent's Hospital, was opened on 28 August 2012 by Prime Minister Julia Gillard. The centre is named after the Kinghorn Foundation, one of the centre's main benefactors.  The Kinghorn Centre for Clinical Genomics (KCCG) was also established in 2012, with a commitment of 9 million in funding from the Kinghorn Foundation.  KCCG is Australia's leading medical research institute in medical genomics and informatics that translates into genome-based personalised medicine. The functions of the KCCG include high quality 'next generation' genome sequencing and diagnostic services.  In 2014 it was announced that the Garvan Institute would be one of the world's first organisations to purchase the next generation of genome sequencing equipment – to be located in the KCCG – capable of sequencing 350 genomes a week (18,000 a year) at a base cost below 1,000 each

Directors

Other notable staff
 Professor Chris Goodnow BVSc, PhD, FAA FRS - Deputy Director and Laboratory Head
 Professor Vanessa Hayes - Laboratory Head, Human Comparative and Prostate Cancer Genomics
 Dr Russell Howard - Commercial Strategy Advisor, Kinghorn Centre for Clinical Genomics
 Professor David James FAA – formerly head of the Diabetes and Obesity division
 Associate Professor Amanda Salis – formerly leader of the Eating Disorders research group

See also

Health in Australia
Connie Johnson (fundraiser)

References

External links 

 Articles from the Garvan Institute on The Conversation

 
Darlinghurst, New South Wales
1963 establishments in Australia